The Washington D.C. Area Film Critics Association Award for Best Documentary is an annual award given by the Washington D.C. Area Film Critics Association.

Winners and nominees

2000s

2010s

2020s

References

See also
Academy Award for Best Documentary Feature

Documentary, Best
American documentary film awards